Else Ury's Nesthäkchen is a Berlin doctor's daughter, Annemarie Braun, a slim, golden blond, quintessential German girl. The ten book Nesthäkchen series follows Annemarie from infancy (Nesthäkchen and Her Dolls) to old age and grandchildren (Nesthäkchen with White Hair). Volume 9 (1924) describes Anne Marie's life as her youngest child, Ursel, Ursel's husband and children, return to Germany after 16 years in Brazil.

Plot summary
It is 1961. Sixteen years have passed since Ursel’s wedding, and she has not seen her family in Germany. Ursel lives with her husband, Milton Tavares, her fourteen year old, very different twins Anita and Marietta, and her little son, Juan (Hans), in São Paulo. The rich family has a luxurious existence, but Ursel works to improve the lot of the exploited plantation laborers. Marietta wants to emulate her mother, while the spoiled Anita thinks only of herself. One day Marietta gets lost on a neighboring plantation and finds a little German girl, Lotte Müller, whose mother is in a mud hut dying. The orphaned Lotte is adopted by the Tavares family and taken on their long-planned trip to Germany to find the mother's relatives.
Annemarie suffers severely during the extended separation from her youngest, Ursel. She has become the most beloved "Omama" of Vronli’s daughter, Gerda, and of Hans' children Lilli, Eva, Ned (presumably named after Annemarie's father, who is originally Edmund and called Ned by his wife) and Heinz.
Annemarie's brother Hans has died. His second wife Margot and his two sons Herbert and Waldemar have disappeared from the story.
When Anita and Marietta arrive in Germany, they have problems, because the two rich girls find it difficult to get used to the simple life, and do not want to help Rudolf and Annemarie with housework. However, the modest Marietta soon adapts, as she distances herself from her dominant twin sister. Little Lotte lives in the Hartenstein house with the servant couple Kunze; she is a replacement for their daughter. Her relatives – originally from  Silesia, after 1945 from Westphalia—cannot be found.
A dramatic turn occurs when Rudolf suffers a heart attack and is afraid to die without having seen Ursel again. Secretly, Marietta sends a telegram to her mother and tells her of the illness of her father. One day, Ursel appears unannounced at the door with the small Juan. Her husband arrives soon after.
At the end, fifteen year old Marietta decides to stay in Germany with Rudolf and Annemarie.

Genre

The Nesthäkchen books represent a German literary genre, the Backfischroman, a girls' novel that describes maturation and was intended for readers 12 – 16 years old. A Backfisch (“teenage girl”, literally “fish for frying”) is a young girl between fourteen and seventeen years of age. The Backfischroman was in fashion between 1850 and 1950. It dealt overwhelmingly with stereotypes, traditional social images of growing girls absorbing societal norms. The stories ended in marriage, with the heroine becoming a Hausfrau. Among the most successful Backfischroman authors, beside Else Ury, were Magda Trott, Emmy von Rhoden with her Der Trotzkopf and Henny Koch. Ury intended to end the Nesthäkchen series with volume 6, Nesthäkchen Flies From the Nest, describing Nesthäkchen's marriage. Meidingers Jugendschriften Verlag, her Berlin publisher, was inundated with a flood of letters from Ury's young fans, begging for more Nesthäkchen stories. After some hesitation, Ury wrote four more Nesthäkchen volumes, and included comments about her initial doubts in an epilogue to volume 7, Nesthäkchen and Her Chicks.

Author
Else Ury (November 1, 1877 in Berlin; January 13, 1943 in the Auschwitz concentration camp) was a German writer and children's book author. Her best-known character is the blonde doctor's daughter Annemarie Braun, whose life from childhood to old age is told in the ten volumes of the highly successful Nesthäkchen series. The books, the six-part TV series Nesthäkchen (1983), based on the first three volumes, as well as the new DVD edition (2005) caught the attention of millions of readers and viewers.

References

German children's literature
Fictional German people
German books
Child characters in literature
Children's fiction books
1924 children's books